Trevor Harrison Brigden (born September 20, 1995) is a Canadian professional baseball pitcher for the Tampa Bay Rays organization.

Brigden attended Okanagan College, where he played college baseball. He also played collegiate summer baseball for the Kelowna Falcons of the West Coast League. The Tampa Bay Rays selected him in the 17th round of the 2019 MLB draft, making him the first player to be drafted from Okanagan.

Brigden played for the Canadian national baseball team in the 2020 Olympic qualifiers. After he returned from the qualifiers, the Rays promoted him to the Bowling Green Hot Rods. The Rays invited him to spring training in 2023.

In 2022, Brigden pitched for the Montgomery Biscuits. He pitched for the Canadian national baseball team in the 2023 World Baseball Classic.

References

External links

Living people
1995 births
Baseball players from Toronto
Sportspeople from North York
Canadian baseball players
Gulf Coast Rays players
Princeton Rays players
Charleston RiverDogs players
Bowling Green Hot Rods players
Durham Bulls players
Scottsdale Scorpions players
Montgomery Biscuits players
2023 World Baseball Classic players